Albert Samuel Inkpin, (also written Inkpen) (16 June 1884 – 29 March 1944) was a British communist and the first General Secretary of the Communist Party of Great Britain (CPGB). He served several terms in prison for political offences. In 1929 he was replaced as head of the CPGB and made head of the party's Friends of Soviet Russia organisation, a position he retained until his death.

Biography

Early years
Albert Inkpin was born on 16 June 1884 in Haggerston, an area of London. He was employed as a clerk and joined the National Union of Clerks, becoming its assistant secretary in 1907.  In 1904, he joined the Marxist Social Democratic Federation (SDF), and became one of its Assistant Secretaries in 1907. He followed the SDF into the new British Socialist Party (BSP) in 1911, continuing in an Assistant Secretary capacity in that new organization.

In 1913 Inkpin was elected General Secretary of the BSP. He was a committed internationalist and anti-militarist, an opponent of World War I, and a delegate to the Zimmerwald Conference. This placed him at odds with former SDF leader H. M. Hyndman's support of British participation in the conflict. This tension between the Left and Right the BSP ended in 1916 with Hyndman and his co-thinkers departing the group. Inkpin assumed editorship of the BSP's weekly newspaper, The Call, at this time.  Inkpin's application in 1917 as a conscientious objector for exemption from military service was rejected by the Hornsey military service tribunal and the Middlesex Appeal Tribunal, but he was temporarily exempted as he was a leading figure in a political party and did not ultimately serve.

Inkpin and the more radical elements were thus in a position of firm control of the BSP organisation after 1916.  He represented the organisation at the foundation of the Hands Off Russia movement, in 1919.  He supported the unity discussions which led to the formation of the Communist Party of Great Britain, in 1920.

Communist leader
Albert Inkpin was Secretary of the Joint Provisional Committee of the Communist Party, the group of representatives of member organisations who set the agenda for the upcoming founding congress. This convention was held in London over the weekend 31 July to 1 August 1920 and was attended by 160 delegates, presenting 211 mandates.  These delegates included his wife, Julia, and brother, Harry.  Inkpin delivered the keynote address to the gathering and was elected to the governing Central Committee of the new political organisation, becoming General Secretary.

Inkpin was named a member of the honorary presidium of the 3rd World Congress of the Communist International, held in Moscow during the summer of 1921.  He returned from Soviet Russia to face more legal difficulties with British authorities. He was charged and convicted for printing and circulating Communist literature, serving a six-month term from January to June 1922. While in prison Inkpin stood as a candidate for London County Council.

Inkpin emerged from jail to become the CPGB's National Organiser, but reverted to being General Secretary the following year. As was the case with top leaders of the early American Communist movement, such as C. E. Ruthenberg and Charles Dirba, Inkpin's background in clerical work no doubt served him well in many of the administrative tasks necessary to run a political organization on a day-to-day basis.

In 1925 Inkpin was again imprisoned, this time as one of 12 prominent Communists charged under the Incitement to Mutiny Act 1797. He was sentenced to six months in prison and remained inside until just prior to the eruption of the British General Strike of May 1926.

Inkpin stood down as General Secretary in 1929, to be replaced by Harry Pollitt, following his opposition to the "class against class" policy, and criticism of his leadership from internal opponents and the Comintern.  He was dropped from the party's secretariat, and sent to Birmingham as an organiser.  While the Comintern sought to end his employment, Pollitt made the case for retaining Inkpin, in particular because of his knowledge of the party's secrets.  Early in 1930, he was appointed as secretary of the CPGB offshoot, the Friends of the Soviet Union, based in Berlin, then from 1933 in Amsterdam.  He remained loyal to the Soviet Union, and during the early stages of World War II became a popular speaker on the possibility of British-Soviet collaboration.
 
In September 1942, Inkpin became ill with cancer, and although he continued working and remained secretary of the British offshoot of the Friends of the Soviet Union, the Russia Today Society, he did not recover, and died in March 1944. He was cremated at Golders Green Crematorium.

Footnotes

Publications by Albert Inkpin
 "Re-Establishing" the Second International: The Communist Party of Great Britain Replies to a Letter of Appeal Signed by Arthur Henderson (for the British Labour Party), J.H. Thomas and Harry Gosling (for the Trades Union Congress), and J. Ramsay MacDonald (for the Second International). London: Communist Party of Great Britain, n.d. [c. 1921].
 The Glory of Stalingrad. London: Russia Today Society, 1942.
 Friends of the USSR: The Story of the Russia Today Society. London: Russia Today Society, n.d. [1942].

External links 
 Inkpin Archive, Marxists Internet Archive, www.marxists.org.
 Graham Stevenson, ''"Albert Inkpin", Compendium of Communist Biography.
 Steve Reynolds, "The Early Years of the Communist Party of Great Britain - 1922-1925", In Defense of Marxism website, www.marxist.com

 

1884 births
1944 deaths
British conscientious objectors
Social Democratic Federation members
British Socialist Party members
Communist Party of Great Britain members
Leaders of political parties in the United Kingdom
British male criminals